Ayriclytus is a genus of beetles in the family Cerambycidae, containing the following species:

 Ayriclytus bolivianus Martins & Galileo, 2011
 Ayriclytus gracilis (Zajciw, 1958)
 Ayriclytus macilentus (Bates, 1872)
 Ayriclytus simoni (Lameere, 1893)

References

Clytini